The Sessions House is a courthouse in Harris Street, Preston, Lancashire, England. The courthouse, which continues to be used for judicial purposes as well as being used as administrative offices for His Majesty's Courts and Tribunals Service, is a Grade II* listed building.

History

The building was commissioned to replace the old Sessions House in Stanley Street. After deciding that the old Sessions House was inadequate for their needs, the justices decided to procure a new building: the site selected was some open land opposite the Harris Museum.

The foundation stone for the new building was laid on 2 February 1900. It was designed by the Manchester architect, Henry Littler, in the Edwardian Baroque style, constructed of sandstone by David Tullis and Sons and opened on 18 June 1904. The design involved a symmetrical main frontage of thirteen bays facing Harris Street. The central section featured a round-headed doorway with a balcony above; there was a round-headed window with elaborate detailing on the first floor and oculus on the second floor flanked by huge Ionic order columns which spanned the second and third floors.

Cases heard within the sessions house have included the trials and subsequent convictions of Jon Venables and Robert Thompson for the murder of James Bulger in November 1993 and of Harold Shipman for the murder of 15 patients under his care in January 2000.

Internally, there are two courtrooms on the first floor that are used daily by Preston Crown Court together with two smaller courtrooms on the ground floor used by the County Court and the Family Court. The Courts Service Area Director's office for Lancashire and Cumbria is also situated in the building.

See also
Listed buildings in Preston, Lancashire

Notes

Buildings and structures in Preston
Grade II* listed buildings in Lancashire
Crown Court buildings
Edwardian architecture
Government buildings completed in 1904
Grade II* listed government buildings
20th-century architecture in the United Kingdom
Court buildings in England